Mission Quarters is a residential area situated in the heart of Thrissur city of Kerala state, of India. It is situated adjacent to S.T Nagar the commercial centre of Thrissur. Jubilee Mission Medical College and Research Institute and Bethel Ashramam are the other important institutions.

See also
Thrissur
Thrissur District

Suburbs of Thrissur city